The Moon and the Stars is a 2007 romantic drama film starring Jonathan Pryce, Alfred Molina, Catherine McCormack and directed by John Irvin.

Plot
A wealthy Jewish homosexual film producer (Molina) is making a film based on Puccini's opera Tosca and a famous German diva (McCormack) is cast opposite a difficult English actor (Pryce). As filming gets under way on a sound stage in Rome, World War II in 1939 escalates around them threatening the film's completion.

Awards
Winner - Best Film Editing (Toby Yates), Milan International Film Festival
Winner - Best Production Design (Amedeo Fago), Milan International Film Festival

See also
Tosca (Italian film, released 1941)

References

External links

2007 romantic drama films
2007 films
English-language Hungarian films
English-language Italian films
Films directed by John Irvin
Hungarian romantic drama films
Films about Fascist Italy
Films about filmmaking
Films about opera
2000s English-language films